Middletown High School serves 9th through 12th grade students in the Enlarged City School District of Middletown, which covers that city as well as adjacent  portions of the towns of Wallkill and Wawayanda in Orange County, New York, United States. It is located on Gardner Avenue in a small outlying area of the city, near the county fairgrounds on a small rise south of NY 211.

The school, formerly Anthony Veraldi Junior High School, built in 1959, replaced the building now known as Twin Towers Middle School as the district's high school in 1976 after a major expansion. It has been expanded at least four times since then.

Student body
Enrollment at Middletown High School was 2,146 students . The student body was made up of 946 Hispanic students, 650 black students, 489 white students, 52 Asian students, and 9 students of two or more races. The school is classified as an inner city district and high poverty district, with 63.6% of students registered for free or reduced price lunch. Middletown had 142 full-time teachers, with a student-teacher ratio of 15 to 1. Average class size at Middletown was roughly 24.

Athletics
The Middletown Middies football team shares a historic rivalry with the Port Jervis High School Red Raiders, named the Erie Bell game after the trophy, which is an old railroad bell from the Port Jervis-Middletown line. The game is an alternating home-and-away series and started in 1897. Middletown leads the series 72-58-7 as of 2015, and has won three of the last four games. Beginning in 2014, the game is on the list of U.S. Marines Great American Rivalry games.

Middletown's boys basketball team is highly regarded in the state, and during the 2011–2012 school year the team went to the final four of the state playoffs. The Middies returned to the playoffs in 2015–2016, making the state finals and losing to Aquinas Institute. The team has a rivalry with the Newburgh Free Academy Goldbacks from nearby Newburgh.

Middletown's track and field team is nationally recognized and has produced a number of successful college athletes and state and national qualifiers. The boys 4x400 meter relay team won a national championship in 2011.

Middletown's tennis program is regarded as one of the best in New York state among public high schools.

Alumni

 Aaron Tveit – actor
 Mike Avilés – baseball player
 Benjamin A. Gilman – former U.S. Congressman and Chairman of the United States House Committee on Foreign Affairs
 Kendrick Ray, basketball player for Maccabi Tel Aviv
 Joseph J. Romm – scientist
 Omari Spellman - NBA player for the Atlanta Hawks, attended for ninth grade
 Michael Hermelee - Just a kid from NY

References

External links 
School website

Public high schools in New York (state)
Schools in Orange County, New York
Middletown, Orange County, New York
School buildings completed in 1939
1939 establishments in New York (state)